Ghanata Senior High School is a boarding public senior high school located in Dodowa in the Greater Accra Region of Ghana.

Founded by Rev. E. Osabutey Aguedze in 1936, initially in Adidome as Gold Coast People's College in the Volta region of Ghana.

The school later moved to its present location in Dodowa where it established its permanent campus. The motto of the school is "Carpe Diem", which means "Seize the Day".

Notable alumni
 Nana Toa Akwatia II, Ghanaian politician
 Issifu Omoro Tanko Amadu, Ghanaian Supreme Court Judge
 Pascaline Edwards, actress
 Godwin Kotey, Ghanaian actor
 Millison Narh, Ghanaian banker
 Kwadwo Baah Agyemang, Ghanaian politician
 Jaja Wachuku, Nigerian statesman, lawyer, politician, diplomat and humanitarian. 
 Victor Kpakpo Addo known as Azigiza Jnr, Ghanaian Reverend, former DJ and Rapper  
 Hayford Adjorlolo popularly know as Rolly Panda , Afrobeat artist

References

Education in the Eastern Region (Ghana)
Educational institutions established in 1936
1930s establishments in Gold Coast (British colony)
1936 establishments in the British Empire